Dactylothrips is a genus of thrips in the family Phlaeothripidae.

Species
 Dactylothrips aenictus
 Dactylothrips ascius
 Dactylothrips atherodes
 Dactylothrips augusta
 Dactylothrips australis
 Dactylothrips boidion
 Dactylothrips bos
 Dactylothrips chaitis
 Dactylothrips dactylis
 Dactylothrips dens
 Dactylothrips digitulus
 Dactylothrips distichus
 Dactylothrips duplicatus
 Dactylothrips fragosus
 Dactylothrips giraulti
 Dactylothrips junix
 Dactylothrips kosmos
 Dactylothrips marsupium
 Dactylothrips papyricola
 Dactylothrips phascolus
 Dactylothrips phoxus
 Dactylothrips precarius
 Dactylothrips priscus
 Dactylothrips racemus
 Dactylothrips rectus
 Dactylothrips skolops
 Dactylothrips taediosus
 Dactylothrips tasmani
 Dactylothrips turba
 Dactylothrips vescus
 Dactylothrips yalgoo

References

Phlaeothripidae
Thrips
Thrips genera